Park Creek is a tributary of the Little Neshaminy Creek, part of the Delaware River Watershed meeting its confluence at the Little Neshaminy's 9.00 river mile.

History
Park Creek is named for Graeme Park near Horsham, Pennsylvania.

Statistics
The Geographic Name Information System I.D. is 1183295, U.S. Department of the Interior Geological Survey I.D. is 02661.

Course
The main creek bed passes through Kohler Park, Deep Meadow Park, and flows along the northwest border of Graeme Park.

Geology
Appalachian Highlands Division
Piedmont Province
Gettysburg Newark Lowland Section
Lockatong Formation
The Little Neshaminy lies entirely within the Lockatong geologic formation, consisting of argillite, shale, limestone, and calcareous shale.

Municipalities
Bucks County
Warrington Township
Montgomery County, Pennsylvania
Horsham Township
Montgomery Township
Lower Gwynedd Township

Crossings and Bridges

See also
List of rivers of Pennsylvania
List of rivers of the United States
List of Delaware River tributaries

References

Rivers of Pennsylvania
Rivers of Bucks County, Pennsylvania
Tributaries of the Neshaminy Creek